Arthur Brynley Creber (11 October 1909 - 10 August 1966) was a Welsh cricketer, who played for Glamorgan and Scotland.  Creber was a right-handed batsman who bowled right-arm medium pace.

Biography
Arthur Brynley Creber was born on 11 October 1909 at Sketty, in Swansea, Glamorgan. He was the son of the cricketer, Harry Creber.

Creber made a single first-class appearance for Glamorgan in 1929 against Leicestershire.

After moving to Scotland he played a single first-class match for the Scotland national cricket team against Yorkshire, a match in which he took his only first-class wicket at the cost of 88 runs.

Creber died at Colwyn Bay, Denbighshire on 10 August 1966.

Family
His father, Harry Creber, played Minor Counties Cricket and first-class cricket for Glamorgan.

References

External links
Arthur Creber at Cricinfo
Arthur Creber at CricketArchive

1909 births
1966 deaths
Cricketers from Swansea
Welsh cricketers
Scotland cricketers
Glamorgan cricketers